Heriberto Quirós Linton (born 26 July 1972 in Cartago) is a retired Costa Rican football player who played for several teams in the Costa Rican Primera División.

Club career
Nicknamed Chimi, he made his debut in the Costa Rican Primera División in 1993 playing with hometown club Cartaginés and he soon become part of the usuals at the starting line-up and one of the most claimed players.

In 1999, Quirós joined Alajuelense and he moved abroad for a spell with Venezuelan side Trujillanos. In summer 2002 he signed for Santos de Guápiles but a serious knee injury hampered his career with the club, finally leaving them after two years of misery for Carmelita.

International career
Quirós made his debut for Costa Rica in a September 1993 friendly match against Saudi Arabia and earned a total of 7 caps, scoring no goals. He represented his country in 1 FIFA World Cup qualification match He also played at the 1997 UNCAF Nations Cup, taking the place of an injured Sandro Alfaro.

His final international was a November 1997 FIFA World Cup qualification match against Canada.

Personal life
Quirós was born one of 8 children of Violeta Linton Foster and raised in Barrio Fátima, Cartago. He is married to Paula Villalobos. His brother, Luis Quirós, also played professionally for Cartaginés and also his brothers Marcos and Carlos played in the Costa Rican Premier Division.

References

External links
 

1972 births
Living people
People from Cartago Province
Association football forwards
Costa Rican footballers
Costa Rica international footballers
C.S. Cartaginés players
L.D. Alajuelense footballers
Santos de Guápiles footballers
A.D. Carmelita footballers
Liga FPD players
Costa Rican expatriate footballers
Expatriate footballers in Venezuela
Copa Centroamericana-winning players